The Annotated Hobbit: The Hobbit, or There and Back Again is an edition of J. R. R. Tolkien's novel The Hobbit with a commentary by Douglas A. Anderson. It was first published in 1988 by Houghton Mifflin Harcourt, Boston, in celebration of the 50th anniversary of the first American publication of The Hobbit, and by Unwin Hyman of London.

Summary
According to the editor, The Annotated Hobbit is a referenced novel where in the margins the "annotator adds commentary". The edition includes also more than 150 black-and-white illustrations from foreign editions and some that were drawn by Tolkien himself. This allows for breadth of understanding of the Hobbit, hence contributing to the overall understanding of Middle-earth.

Purpose of publication
The main purpose behind the publication of The Annotated Hobbit was to allow readers to understand "how Tolkien worked as a writer, what his influences and interests were, and how these relate to the invented world of Middle-earth." Moreover, this also allowed for the publication of rare poems written by Tolkien (several of which were previously unpublished). This may help the reader improve the understanding of the culture that surrounds The Hobbit and Middle-earth in general.

Editions
In 2002, after the initial publication of The Annotated Hobbit, a "Revised and Expanded Edition" was published. This version included maps and colour paintings. It also provided newer sources and greater understanding of Tolkien's legendarium. The appendix includes a chapter "The Quest of Erebor" about Gandalf's motivation to join Bilbo to the dwarven company. Another British edition was published in 2003 by HarperCollins of London.

Translations

Translations into other languages include the following (translated titles deviating from the original English version have been explained):

 French: 
 German: 
 Italian:
 First edition: 
 Second edition: 
 Japanese: 
 Spanish: 
 Polish: 
 Hungarian: 
 Chinese:

Reception
The Annotated Hobbit has been called "the most informative edition" of The Hobbit. Shippey noted that the earliest version of Tolkien's poem "The Hoard" from 1923 was best accessible in this book. The Annotated Hobbit won the 1990 Mythopoeic Scholarship Award in "Inkling studies" by the Mythopoeic Society.

See also
English-language editions of The Hobbit

References

The Hobbit
1988 British novels
Houghton Mifflin books